Christian Sturm (born 18 January 1978 in Andernach, West Germany) is a German tenor.

Life

He began his training as a singer at the University of music and dramatic arts in Graz, Austria, before moving to the University of music and performing arts in Munich, studying firstly with Helmut Deutsch, Daphne Evangelatos, and Christian Gerhaher.

His operatic début was as Acis in Handels Acis and Galatea on the steps of the Pergamon Altar in Berlin alongside Annette Dasch. He has sung in numerous productions at the Prinzregententheater and Staatstheater am Gärtnerplatz in Munich: Purcell's King Arthur (production: Claus Guth), Handel's Rodrigo – Giuliano –  and Britten's A Midsummer Night's Dream – Lysander, Cavallis La Didone – Aeneas, and Belfiore in Mozart's Gärtnerin aus Liebe (production: Christian Pöppelreiter).

As a freelance artist he has performed at the Nationaltheater Weimar, at the Nationaltheater Mannheim, at the Deutsche Oper am Rhein, and the Hessisches Staatstheater Wiesbaden, among others. Sturm is a regular guest at the Wagner Festival in Austria appearing in Tristan und Isolde, Parsifal, Tannhäuser, and Der fliegende Holländer.

His repertoire extends from Agostino Steffani and Johann Simon Mayr to Erich Korngold, as well as the world premiere of operas for the ADevantgarde Festival  in Munich and the Opera Wuppertal.

Recordings include Steffani's Stabat Mater and Le Triomphe de la Paix by Pietro Torri, the Richard Strauss adaption of Mozart's Idomeneo as well as several productions for the WDR Köln.

Roles

Lysander (A Midsummer Night's Dream)
Tamino (Die Zauberflöte)
Idamante (Idomeneo)
Arbace (Idomeneo)
Belfiore (La finta giardiniera)
Froh (Das Rheingold)
Alfred (Die Fledermaus)
Fuchs (The Little Prince)
Telemaco (Il ritorno d'Ulisse in patria)
Acis (Acis and Galatea)
Giuliano (Rodrigo)
Sesto (Giulio Cesare)
Cocle (Die stumme Serenade)
Aeneas (Dido and Aeneas)
Aeneas (La Didone)
Jamie (The Last Five Years)
Junger Seemann (Tristan und Isolde)
Ali (L'incontro improvviso)
Moore of Moore Hall (The Dragon of Wantley)
Nerone (L'incoronazione di Poppea)

External links
Christian Sturm – Tenor
A•Devantgarde
Opernhaus Wuppertal

1978 births
Living people
People from Andernach
German operatic tenors
21st-century German male opera singers